Coleophora ochrea is a moth of the family Coleophoridae found in Europe. It was first described by Adrian Hardy Haworth in 1828.

Description
Adults have ochreous forewings. They are on wing from July to August.

The larvae feed on white rock-rose (Helianthemum apenninum), common rock-rose (Helianthemum nummularium), Helianthemum nummularium obscurum and annual rock-rose (Tuberaria guttata). They create a large, composite leaf case of  length. The fully developed case consists of three successive leaf fragments. It is light brown, bivalved and has a mouth angle of about 45°. Larvae can be found from September to the end of May of the following year.

Distribution
It is found from Sweden to the Iberian Peninsula, Italy and Crete and from Great Britain to southern Russia.

References

ochrea
Leaf miners
Moths described in 1828
Moths of Europe
Taxa named by Adrian Hardy Haworth